The Sur Sports Complex Stadium is a multi-use stadium in Sur, Oman. It is used mostly for football matches and also sometimes for athletics. It is the home stadium of Oman Professional League side Sur FC. The stadium has a capacity of 8,000 people and was opened in 1996.

References

Football venues in Oman
Sports venues in Oman